Lesser Abkhazia (Georgian: ჯიქეთი, Jiqeti) was the term used to refer to those lands of Abkhazia that were not subject to the direct control of the ruling Shervashidze dynasty.

History 
After the Russian-Circassian War, the bulk of the mountaineers relocated to the Ottoman Empire, while the depopulated coastline was gradually colonized by Christian settlers of various ethnicity.

Sadzen was an ill-defined region on the eastern shore of the Black Sea which used to be settled by the Sadz people, hence the name. In the mid-19th century, it came to be known in Russian and Western literature as Lesser Abkhazia.  According to Ivane Javakhishvili it is a historical part of Georgia.

The northern part of Sadzen today forms part of Greater Sochi, while the southern part falls within the borders of Abkhazia. The Sochi conflict took place in Sadzen in 1918-1920.

See also
Principality of Abkhazia
Ubykhia
Upper Abkhazia

References

History of Kuban
Historical regions of Georgia (country)
Regions of Abkhazia
Subdivisions of Abkhazia